Department Electra House was full name of the wartime office of Department EH, named after its London Office, Electra House and was one of the three British organisations that merged in World War II to form the Special Operations Executive.

References

External links 
 The Political Intelligence Department and Department Electra House

United Kingdom home front during World War II